Stölzel is a surname. Notable people with the surname include:

 Gottfried Heinrich Stölzel (1690–1749), German baroque composer
 Heinrich Stölzel (1777–1844), German horn player
 Ingrid Stölzel (born 1971), German composer of classical music

See also
 Stolze